This is a list of flora of Utah, a state in the western United States, listed alphabetically by family. , there are 3,930 species of plants in Utah, with 3,128 of those being indigenous and 792 being introduced through various means.

Plants sorted by family
Each entry lists the scientific name first (sorted alphabetically), then one or more common names for the plant (if any). Flora that have been introduced to the state are indicated with an † at the right of the scientific name. Entries are otherwise native. Entries marked with ‡ are considered invasive or noxious per the official list of noxious weeds maintained by the Utah Department of Agriculture and Food, though nine of those are not known to exist in Utah and have therefore not been included here.

Amaranthaceae
Allenrolfea occidentalis – iodine bush
Atriplex argentea – silverscale saltbush, silver orache
Atriplex canescens – chamiso, chamiza, four-wing saltbush
Atriplex confertifolia – shadscale
Atriplex elegans – wheelscale saltbush, Mecca orach, wheelscale
Atriplex garrettii – Garrett's saltbush
Atriplex hymenelytra – desert holly
Atriplex lentiformis – quail bush, big saltbrush, big saltbush, quailbrush, lenscale, len-scale saltbush, white thistle
Atriplex nuttallii – Nuttall's saltbush
Atriplex phyllostegia – arrowscale, leafcover saltweed, Truckee orach
Atriplex polycarpa – allscale, cattle spinach, allscale saltbush, cattle saltbush
Atriplex robusta
Atriplex truncata – wedgeleaf saltbush, wedgescale, wedge orach
Blitum bonus-henricus (also Chenopodium bonus-henricus)† – Good-King-Henry, poor-man's asparagus, perennial goosefoot, Lincolnshire spinach, Markery, English mercury, mercury goosefoot
Blitum capitatum (or Chenopodium capitatum) – blite goosefoot, strawberry goosefoot, strawberry spinach, Indian paint, Indian ink
Blitum virgatum (or Chenopodium foliosum)† – leafy goosefoot
Chenopodiastrum murale (or Chenopodium murale) – nettle-leaved goosefoot, Australian-spinach, salt-green, sowbane
Chenopodium album† – lamb's quarters, melde, goosefoot, manure weed, wild spinach, fat-hen, white goosefoot
Chenopodium atrovirens – pinyon goosefoot, dark goosefoot
Chenopodium berlandieri – pitseed goosefoot, huauzontle, lamb's quarters, lambsquarters
Chenopodium desiccatum – aridland goosefoot, slimleaf goosefoot
Chenopodium fremontii – Frémont's goosefoot
Chenopodium graveolens (or Dysphania graveolens)† – fetid goosefoot
Chenopodium hians – hians goosefoot, gaping goosefoot
Chenopodium humile† – marshland goosefoot
Chenopodium incanum – mealy goosefoot
Chenopodium leptophyllum – narrowleaf goosefoot
Chenopodium overi – Over's goosefoot
Chenopodium pratericola – desert goosefoot
Chenopodium salinum – Rocky Mountain goosefoot
Chenopodium simplex – mapleleaf goosefoot
Chenopodium subglabrum – smooth goosefoot
Chenopodium watsonii – Watson's goosefoot
Dysphania ambrosioides† – wormseed, Jesuit's tea, Mexican-tea, payqu, paico, epazote, mastruz, herba sanctæ Mariæ
Dysphania botrys† – Jerusalem oak goosefoot, sticky goosefoot, feathered geranium
Grayia spinosa – hop sage, spiny hop sage
Halogeton glomeratus† – saltlover, Aral barilla, and halogeton
Krascheninnikovia lanata – winterfat
Oxybasis chenopodioides (or Chenopodium chenopodioides) – low goosefoot
Oxybasis rubra (or Chenopodium rubrum) – red goosefoot, coastblite goosefoot, on’-tǐm-pi-wa-tsǐp, on’-tǐm-pi-wa, on’-tǐm-pi-a-wa, on’-tǐm-pai-wa
Salicornia rubra – red swampfire
Salicornia utahensis – Utah swampfire
Suaeda nigra (formerly Suaeda moquinii) – Mojave sea-blite, bush seepweed

Amaryllidaceae
Allium atrorubens – dark red onion
Allium brandegeei – Brandegee's onion
Allium brevistylum – shortstyle onion
Allium lemmonii – Lemmon's onion
Allium nevadense – Nevada onion
Allium parvum – small onion
Allium passeyi – Passey's onion
Allium textile – prairie onion, textile onion

Anacardiaceae
Rhus typhina – staghorn sumac

Apiaceae
Angelica wheeleri – Utah angelica
Conium maculatum†‡ – hemlock, poison hemlock
Cymopterus basalticus – Intermountain wavewing
Cymopterus beckii – featherleaf springparsley, Beck springparsley, pinnate springparsley
Cymopterus evertii – Evert's springparsley, Evert's waferparsnip
Cymopterus globosus – globe springparsley
Lomatium ambiguum – Wyeth biscuitroot
Lomatium grayi – Gray's biscuitroot, Gray's lomatium, milfoil lomatium
Lomatium latilobum – Canyonlands lomatium, Canyonlands biscuitroot
Lomatium macrocarpum – bigseed lomatium, biscuit root, bigseed biscuitroot
Lomatium nevadense – Nevada biscuitroot
Lomatium nudicaule – pestle lomatium, barestem biscuitroot, Indian celery, Indian consumption plant
Lomatium triternatum – nineleaf biscuitroot

Apocynaceae
Asclepias fascicularis – narrowleaf milkweed, Mexican whorled milkweed
Asclepias welshii – Welsh's milkweed
Cycladenia humilis – Sacramento waxydogbane
Funastrum utahense – Utah swallow-wort, Utah vine milkweed

Asparagaceae
Agave utahensis – Utah agave, Nevada agave, Kaibab agave
Androstephium breviflorum – pink funnel lily, small flowered androstephium
Camassia quamash – camas, small camas, common camas, common camash, quamash
Dipterostemon capitatus – blue dicks, purplehead, brodiaea
Eremocrinum albomarginatum – Utah solitaire lily, Intermountain false-wheatgrass, desert lily, lonely lily, sand lily
Yucca angustissima – narrowleaf yucca
Yucca elata – soaptree, soaptree yucca, soapweed, palmella
Yucca sterilis
Yucca utahensis

Asteraceae
Acamptopappus sphaerocephalus – rayless goldenhead
Acourtia wrightii – brownfoot
Agoseris grandiflora – California dandelion, bigflower agoseris, grassland agoseris
Agoseris retrorsa – spearleaf agoseris, spearleaf mountain dandelion
Ambrosia acanthicarpa† – flatspine bur ragweed, Hooker's bur-ragweed, annual burrweed, annual bur-sage, western sand-bur
Ambrosia artemisiifolia† – common ragweed, annual ragweed, low ragweed, American wormwood, bitterweed, blackweed, carrot weed, hay fever weed, Roman wormwood, short ragweed, stammerwort, stickweed, tassel weed
Ambrosia confertiflora – weakleaf bur ragweed
Ambrosia dumosa – burro-weed, white bursage
Ambrosia eriocentra – woolly bursage, woollyfruit burr ragweed
Ambrosia psilostachya – Cuman ragweed and perennial ragweed, western ragweed
Ambrosia salsola (or Hymenoclea salsola) – cheesebush, winged ragweed, burrobush, white burrobrush, desert pearl
Ambrosia sandersonii (or Hymenoclea sandersonii) – Sanderson's burrobrush
Ambrosia tomentosa – skeletonleaf bur ragweed, silverleaf povertyweed, skeleton-leaf bursage
Ambrosia trifida – giant ragweed, great ragweed, Texan great ragweed, giant ragweed, tall ragweed, blood ragweed, perennial ragweed, horseweed, buffaloweed, kinghead
Amphipappus fremontii – chaffbush, eytelia
Arnica gracilis – Smallhead arnica
Arnica rydbergii – Rydberg's arnica, subalpine arnica, subalpine leopardbane
Artemisia arbuscula – little sagebrush, low sagebrush, black sagebrush
Artemisia bigelovii – Bigelow sagebrush, flat sagebrush
Artemisia cana – silver sagebrush, sticky sagebrush, silver wormwood, hoary sagebrush, dwarf sagebrush
Artemisia michauxiana – Michaux's wormwood, lemon sagewort
Artemisia nova – black sagebrush
Artemisia pygmaea – pygmy sagebrush
Artemisia spinescens – budsage, bud sagebrush
Artemisia tridentata – big sagebrush, Great Basin sagebrush, sagebrush
Baccharis salicifolia – mule fat, seepwillow, water-wally
Baileya multiradiata – desert marigold
Brickellia microphylla – littleleaf brickellbush
Carduus nutans†‡ – musk thistle, nodding thistle, nodding plumeless thistle
Centaurea calcitrapa†‡ – red star-thistle, purple starthistle
Centaurea diffusa†‡ – diffuse knapweed, white knapweed, tumble knapweed
Centaurea solstitialis†‡ – yellow star-thistle, golden starthistle, yellow cockspur, St. Barnaby's thistle, Barnaby thistle
Centaurea stoebe†‡ – spotted knapweed, panicled knapweed
Centaurea virgata†‡ – squarrose knapweed
Chaenactis stevioides – Esteve's pincushion, desert pincushion
Chaetopappa ericoides – rose heath, heath-leaved chaetopappa
Chondrilla juncea†‡ – rush skeletonweed, gum succory, devil's grass, nakedweed
Chrysothamnus depressus – long-flowered rabbitbrush
Chrysothamnus greenei – Greene's rabbitbrush
Chrysothamnus scopulorum – Grand Canyon glowweed, evening-daisy
Chrysothamnus stylosus – pillar false gumweed, resinbush
Chrysothamnus viscidiflorus – yellow rabbitbrush, green rabbitbrush
Cirsium arvense†‡ – creeping thistle, Canada thistle, field thistle
Cirsium barnebyi – Barneby's thistle
Cirsium eatonii – Eaton's thistle, mountaintop thistle
Cirsium rydbergii – alcove thistle, Rydberg's thistle
Crepis modocensis – Modoc hawksbeard
Encelia nutans – noddinghead, nodding sunray
Encelia resinifera – sticky brittlebush, button brittlebush
Enceliopsis argophylla – silverleaf sunray, nakedstem sunray, naked-stemmed daisy
Ericameria crispa – crisped goldenbush
Ericameria lignumviridis – Greenwood's goldenbush, heath-goldenrod
Ericameria obovata – Rydberg's goldenbush
Ericameria watsonii – Watson's goldenbush
Ericameria zionis – subalpine goldenbush, cedar breaks goldenbush
Erigeron arenarioides – sand fleabane, Wasatch fleabane
Erigeron canaani – Abajo fleabane
Erigeron clokeyi – Clokey's fleabane, Clokey's daisy
Erigeron cronquistii – Cronquist's fleabane
Erigeron garrettii – Garrett's fleabane
Erigeron goodrichii – Uinta Mountain fleabane
Erigeron kachinensis – Kachina fleabane, Kachina daisy
Erigeron maguirei – Maguire daisy, Maguire's fleabane
Erigeron mancus – depauperate fleabane, imperfect fleabane
Erigeron melanocephalus – black-headed fleabane
Erigeron religiosus – Clear Creek fleabane
Erigeron sionis – Zion fleabane
Erigeron untermannii – Indian Canyon fleabane
Eriophyllum lanatum – common woolly sunflower, Oregon sunshine
Gaillardia arizonica – Arizonia blanketflower
Gaillardia parryi – Parry's blanketflower
Gutierrezia petradoria – San Pedro snakeweed, goldenrod snakeweed
Gutierrezia sarothrae (or Gutierrezia pomariensis) – broom snakeweed, broomweed, snakeweed, matchweed
Helianthus paradoxus – paradox sunflower, puzzle sunflower, Pecos sunflower
Heliomeris soliceps – tropical false goldeneye, paria sunflower
Herrickia kingii – King's serpentweed, King's aster
Herrickia wasatchensis – Wasatch aster
Heterotheca jonesii – Jones's goldenaster
Hymenoxys biennis
Hymenoxys bigelovii – Bigelow's rubberweed
Hymenoxys subintegra – Arizona rubberweed
Isocoma humilis – Zion goldenbush, Zion jimmyweed
Isocoma rusbyi – Rusby's goldenbush
Layia platyglossa – coastal tidytips
Lepidospartum latisquamum – Nevada broomsage
Leucanthemum vulgare†‡ – ox-eye daisy, oxeye daisy, dog daisy, field daisy, Marguerite, moon daisy, moon-penny, poor-land penny, poverty daisy, white daisy
Lorandersonia baileyi – Bailey's rabbitbrush
Lorandersonia linifolia – rabbitbush
Lygodesmia doloresensis – Dolores River skeletonplant
Lygodesmia grandiflora – largeflower skeletonplant, showy rushpink
Madia gracilis – grassy tarweed, slender tarweed, gumweed madia
Onopordum acanthium†‡ – cotton thistle, Scotch thistle, Scottish thistle
Packera castoreus – Beaver Mountain groundsel, Beaver Mountain ragwort
Packera malmstenii – Podunk ragwort
Packera musiniensis – Musinea ragwort, Musinea groundsel
Peucephyllum schottii – pygmy cedar, Schott's pygmy cedar, desert fir, desert pine
Pyrrocoma apargioides – alpineflames
Pyrrocoma clementis – tranquil goldenweed
Rafinesquia neomexicana – desert chicory, plumeseed, New Mexico plumeseed
Rhaponticum repens (or Acroptilon repens)†‡ – Russian knapweed
Scorzonera laciniata†‡ – mediterranean serpent-root
Senecio bigelovii – nodding groundsel, nodding ragwort
Senecio fremontii – dwarf mountain ragwort
Stenotus armerioides – thrift mock goldenweed
Stylocline intertexta – Morefield's neststraw, Mojave neststraw
Stylocline psilocarphoides – baretwig neststraw, Peck's neststraw
Thelesperma pubescens – hairy greenthread, Uinta greenthread
Townsendia aprica – Last Chance Townsend daisy
Wyethia arizonica – Arizona mule's ears
Xanthisma paradoxum
Xylorhiza confertifolia – Henrieville woody-aster
Xylorhiza cronquistii – Cronquist's woody-aster

Boraginaceae
Amsinckia tessellata – bristly fiddleneck, tessellate fiddleneck, checker fiddleneck, devil's lettuce
Cryptantha virginensis – Virgin River cryptantha
Cynoglossum officinale†‡ – houndstongue, houndstooth, dog's tongue, gypsy flower, rats and mice
Echium vulgare†‡ – viper's bugloss, blueweed
Eriodictyon angustifolium – narrowleaf yerba santa
Hackelia micrantha – Jessica sticktight, Jessica's stickseed
Mertensia ciliata – tall fringed bluebells, mountain bluebells, streamside bluebells
Mertensia lanceolata – prairie bluebells, narrow-leaved languid lady, lance-leaved bluebells, lance-leaved lungwort
Nemophila parviflora – smallflower nemophila, small-flowered nemophila, oak-leaved nemophila
Phacelia anelsonii – Aven Nelson's phacelia
Phacelia argillacea – clay phacelia, Atwood's phacelia
Phacelia austromontana – Southern Sierra phacelia
Phacelia curvipes – Washoe phacelia, Washoe scorpionweed
Phacelia mammillarensis – Nipple Beach phacelia
Tiquilia canescens – woody crinklemat, shrubby tiquilia
Phacelia argillacea – clay phacelia and Atwood's phacelia

Brassicaceae
Alliaria petiolata†‡ – jack-by-the-hedge, garlic mustard, garlic root, hedge garlic, sauce-alone, jack-in-the-bush, penny hedge, poor man's mustard
Boechera falcatoria – Grouse Creek rockcress
Boechera pulchra (or Arabis pulchra) – beautiful rockcress
Brassica elongata†‡ – elongated mustard, long-stalked rape
Brassica tournefortii†‡ – Asian mustard, pale cabbage, African mustard, Sahara mustard
Caulanthus cooperi – Cooper's wild cabbage
Caulanthus crassicaulis – thickstem wild cabbage
Caulanthus major – slender wild cabbage
Caulanthus pilosus – hairy wild cabbage, chocolate drops
Descurainia paradisa
Draba burkei – snowbasin draba, Burke's draba
Draba ramulosa – Mt. Belknap draba, Tushar Mountain draba
Glaucocarpum suffrutescens (also Hesperidanthus suffrutescens and Schoenocrambe suffrutescens) – Uinta Basin waxfruit, waxfruit mustard, toad-flax cress, shrubby reed-mustard
Hesperis matronalis†‡ – dame's rocket, damask-violet, dame's-violet, dames-wort, dame's gilliflower, night-scented gilliflower, queen's gilliflower, rogue's gilliflower, summer lilac, sweet rocket, mother-of-the-evening, winter gilliflower
Isatis tinctoria†‡ – woad, dyer's woad, glastum, Asp of Jerusalem
Lepidium barnebyanum – Barneby's pepperweed, Barneby's pepper-grass, Barneby's ridge-cress
Lepidium dictyotum – alkali pepperweed, alkali pepperwort
Lepidium draba (or Cardaria draba)†‡ – whitetop, hoary cress, Thanet cress
Lepidium fremontii – desert pepperweed
Lepidium latifolium†‡ – perennial pepperweed, broadleaved pepperweed, pepperwort, or peppergrass, dittander, dittany, tall whitetop
Lepidium montanum – mountain pepperweed, mountain peppergrass, mountain pepperwort, mountain pepperplant
Lepidium nanum –  dwarf pepperweed
Lepidium ostleri – Ostler peppergrass
Physaria chambersii – Chambers' twinpod
Physaria fendleri – Fendler's bladderpod, popweed, lesquerella
Physaria hemiphysaria –  Intermountain bladderpod, skyline bladderpod, Tavaputs bladderpod, Range Creek bladderpod
Physaria lepidota – Kane County twinpod
Physaria navajoensis – Navajo twinpod, Navajo bladderpod
Physaria parvula – pygmy bladderpod
Physaria repanda – Indian Canyon twinpod
Physaria tumulosa (or Lesquerella tumulosa) – Kodachrome bladderpod
Schoenocrambe argillacea – clay reed-mustard, Uinta Basin plainsmustard, clay thelypody
Schoenocrambe barnebyi – Barneby reed-mustard, Syes Butte plainsmustard, Barneby thelypody
Smelowskia americana – alpine smelowskia, Siberian smelowskia, American false candytuft
Thelypodium laxiflorum – droopflower thelypody
Thelypodium milleflorum – manyflower thelypody, many-flowered thelypodium

Cactaceae
Cylindropuntia acanthocarpa – buckhorn cholla
Cylindropuntia echinocarpa – silver cholla, golden cholla, Wiggins' cholla
Cylindropuntia imbricata – cane cholla, walking stick cholla, tree cholla, chainlink cactus
Echinocereus relictus
Ferocactus cylindraceus – California barrel cactus, desert barrel cactus, miner's compass
Grusonia pulchella – sagebrush cholla
Mammillaria tetrancistra – common fishhook cactus
Opuntia aurea
Opuntia basilaris – beavertail cactus, beavertail pricklypear
Opuntia engelmannii – cow's tongue cactus, cow tongue prickly pear, desert prickly pear, discus prickly pear, Engelmann's prickly pear, Texas prickly pear, nopal, abrojo, joconostle, vela de coyote
Opuntia pinkavae – Bulrush Canyon prickly-pear, Pinkava's pricklypear
Pediocactus despainii – Despain's cactus, San Rafael cactus
Pediocactus sileri – Siler's pincushion cactus, gypsum cactus, gypsum plains cactus
Pediocactus winkleri – Winkler's cactus, Winkler's pincushion cactus
Sclerocactus brevispinus – Pariette cactus
Sclerocactus sileri – Siler fishhook cactus
Sclerocactus wetlandicus – Uinta Basin hookless cactus, Pariette cactus
Sclerocactus wrightiae – Wright's little barrel cactus, Wright's fishhook cactus

Cannabaceae
Celtis occidentalis – common hackberry, nettletree, sugarberry, beaverwood, northern hackberry, American hackberry

Caprifoliaceae
Symphoricarpos longiflorus – desert snowberry, fragrant snowberry
Symphoricarpos occidentalis – western snowberry, wolfberry
Symphoricarpos oreophilus – mountain snowberry
Symphoricarpos rotundifolius – round-leaved snowberry

Caryophyllaceae
Achyronychia cooperi – onyxflower, frost-mat
Arenaria macradenia – Mojave sandwort, desert sandwort
Minuartia pusilla – annual sandwort, dwarf stitchwort
Minuartia stricta – bog stitchwort, Teesdale sandwort, rock sandwort
Silene verecunda – San Francisco campion

Cleomaceae
Wislizenia refracta –  jackass-clover, spectacle fruit

Convolvulaceae
Calystegia longipes – Paiute false bindweed
Convolvulus spp.†‡ – bindweed, morning glory, wild morning glory
Cuscuta salina – salt marsh dodder

Cupressaceae
Juniperus communis – common juniper
Juniperus osteosperma (or Juniperus utahensis) –  Utah juniper
Juniperus scopulorum – Rocky Mountain juniper

Cyperaceae
Carex cusickii – Cusick's sedge
Carex luzulina – woodrush sedge
Carex multicostata – manyrib sedge
Carex simulata – analogue sedge
Carex spectabilis – showy sedge
Carex specuicola – Navajo sedge
Carex straminiformis – Shasta sedge
Fimbristylis thermalis – hot springs fimbry
Kobresia sibirica – Siberian bog sedge

Elaeagnaceae
Elaeagnus angustifolia†‡ – Russian olive, silver berry, oleaster, wild olive
Shepherdia argentea – silver buffaloberry, bull berry, thorny buffaloberry

Ephedraceae
Ephedra aspera – rough jointfir, boundary ephedra, pitamoreal
Ephedra cutleri – Navajo ephedra, Cutler's jointfir
Ephedra fasciculata – Arizona ephedra, Arizona jointfir, desert Mormon-tea
Ephedra nevadensis – Nevada ephedra
Ephedra torreyana – Torrey's jointfir, Torrey's Mormon tea
Ephedra viridis – green Mormon tea, green ephedra, Indian tea

Ericaceae
Arctostaphylos pungens – pointleaf manzanita
Chimaphila menziesii – little prince's pine, Little Pipsissewa

Euphorbiaceae
Croton californicus – California croton
Euphorbia albomarginata (formerly Chamaesyce albomarginata) – whitemargin sandmat, rattlesnake weed
Euphorbia esula†‡ – green spurge, leafy spurge
Euphorbia myrsinites†‡ – myrtle spurge, blue spurge, broad-leaved glaucous-spurge

Fabaceae
Alhagi maurorum†‡ – camelthorn, camelthorn-bush, Caspian manna, Persian mannaplant
Astragalus ampullarioides – Shivwits milkvetch
Astragalus anserinus – Goose Creek milkvetch
Astragalus desereticus – Deseret milkvetch
Astragalus equisolensis – horseshoe milkvetch
Astragalus filipes – basalt milkvetch
Astragalus flavus – yellow milkvetch
Astragalus holmgreniorum – Holmgren milkvetch, paradox milkvetch
Astragalus iselyi – Isely's milkvetch
Astragalus lentiginosus – spotted locoweed, freckled milkvetch
Astragalus loanus – Glenwood milkvetch
Astragalus oophorus – egg milkvetch
Astragalus montii – heliotrope milkvetch
Astragalus wetherillii – Wetherill's milkvetch
Astragalus zionis – Zion milkvetch
Cercis occidentalis – western redbud, California redbud
Cytisus scoparius†‡ – common broom, Scotch broom, Scot's broom, English broom, broom
Dalea candida var. oligophylla – western prairie clover
Dalea searlsiae – Searls' prairie clover
Galega officinalis†‡ – galega, goat's-rue, French lilac, Italian fitch, professor-weed
Lupinus kingii – King's lupine
Ottleya rigida – shrubby deervetch, desert rock-pea
Oxytropis campestris – field locoweed
Psorothamnus fremontii – Frémont's dalea, Frémont's indigo bush
Psorothamnus polydenius – Nevada dalea, Nevada indigobush
Thermopsis montana – false lupin, mountain goldenbanner, golden pea, mountain thermopsis, revonpapu
Trifolium beckwithii – Beckwith's clover
Trifolium eriocephalum – woollyhead clover, hairy head clover
Trifolium friscanum – Frisco clover
Trifolium kingii – King's clover

Fagaceae
Quercus gambelii – Gambel oak, scrub oak, oak brush, white oak
Quercus welshii – wavy leaf oak, shinnery oak, Tucker oak

Garryaceae
Garrya flavescens – ashy silktassel

Gentianaceae
Frasera albomarginata – desert green gentian, desert frasera
Frasera gypsicola – Sunnyside green-gentian, Sunnyside elkweed, Sunnyside frasera
Gentiana parryi – Parry's gentian

Geraniaceae
Geranium caespitosum – purple cluster geranium, pineywoods geranium

Hypericaceae
Hypericum perforatum†‡ – perforate St John's-wort, common Saint John's wort, St John's wort, Tipton's weed, rosin rose, goatweed, chase-devil, Klamath weed

Lamiaceae
Agastache urticifolia – nettleleaf giant hyssop, horse mint
Salvia azurea – azure blue sage, azure sage, blue sage, prairie sage
Salvia columbariae – chia, chia sage, golden chia, desert chia, pashiiy, it'epeš
Salvia dorrii – purple sage, Dorr's sage, fleshy sage, mint sage, tobacco sage

Liliaceae
Calochortus ambiguus – Arizona mariposa lily, doubting mariposa lily
Calochortus bruneaunis – Bruneau mariposa lily
Calochortus ciscoensis
Calochortus flexuosus – winding Mariposa lily, straggling Mariposa lily

Loasaceae
Eucnide urens – desert rock nettle, desert stingbush, velcro plant, vegetable velcro
Mentzelia goodrichii – Goodrich's blazingstar
Mentzelia laevicaulis – giant blazingstar, smoothstem blazingstar

Lythraceae
Lythrum salicaria†‡ – purple loosestrife, spiked loosestrife, purple lythrum

Malvaceae
Sidalcea oregana – Oregon checkerbloom
Sphaeralcea ambigua – desert globemallow, apricot mallow
Sphaeralcea gierischii – Gierisch's globemallow, Gierisch mallow
Sphaeralcea rusbyi – Rusby's globemallow, Rusby's desert-mallow

Montiaceae
Cistanthe umbellata – Mount Hood pussypaws, pussy-paws

Nyctaginaceae
Abronia mellifera – white sand verbena
Mirabilis laevis – desert wishbone-bush

Oleaceae
Fraxinus anomala – single-leaf ash
Menodora spinescens – spiny menodora

Onagraceae
Calylophus lavandulifolius (formerly Oenothera lavandulifolia) – lavender leaf sundrops
Camissonia bairdii
Oenothera albicaulis – prairie evening-primrose, white-stem evening-primrose, whitish evening primrose, whitest evening primrose
Oenothera californica – California evening primrose
Oenothera primiveris – yellow desert evening primrose, bottle evening-primrose, desert evening-primrose

Orchidaceae
Cypripedium fasciculatum – clustered lady's slipper
Spiranthes diluvialis – Ute lady's tresses, Ute ladies'-tresses

Orobanchaceae
Castilleja angustifolia – northwestern Indian paintbrush, desert Indian paintbrush
Castilleja applegatei – Applegate's Indian paintbrush, wavyleaf Indian paintbrush
Castilleja aquariensis – Aquarius Plateau Indian paintbrush
Castilleja linariifolia – Wyoming Indian paintbrush, narrow-leaved Indian paintbrush, desert paintbrush, Wyoming desert paintbrush, Wyoming paintbrush, linaria-leaved Indian Paintbrush, Indian paintbrush
Castilleja occidentalis – western Indian paintbrush
Castilleja septentrionalis – pale painted cup, northern painted cup, pale Indian paintbrush, Labrador Indian paintbrush
Pedicularis centranthera – dwarf lousewort, Great Basin lousewort

Paeoniaceae
Paeonia brownii – Brown's peony, native peony, western peony

Papaveraceae
Arctomecon californica – California bearpoppy, Las Vegas bearpoppy, golden bearpoppy, yellow-flowered desert poppy
Arctomecon humilis – bearclaw poppy, dwarf bearclaw-poppy
Dicentra uniflora – longhorn steer's head
Eschscholzia minutiflora – pygmy poppy
Platystemon californicus – creamcups

Phrymaceae
Erythranthe suksdorfii – Suksdorf's monkeyflower, miniature monkeyflower
Mimetanthe pilosa – false monkeyflower, downy mimetanthe

Pinaceae
Abies concolor – white fir
Abies lasiocarpa – subalpine fir, Rocky Mountain fir, Rocky Mountain subalpine fir
Picea engelmannii – Engelmann spruce, white spruce, mountain spruce, silver spruce
Pinus edulis – Colorado pinyon, two-needle piñon, pinyon pine, piñon
Pinus flexilis – limber pine, Rocky Mountain white pine
Pinus longaeva – Great Basin bristlecone pine, intermountain bristlecone pine, western bristlecone pine
Pinus monophylla – single-leaf pinyon, single-leaf piñon
Pinus ponderosa – ponderosa pine, bull pine, blackjack pine, western yellow-pine, or filipinus pine
Pseudotsuga menziesii var. glauca – Rocky Mountain Douglas-fir

Plantaginaceae
Linaria dalmatica†‡ – Balkan toadflax, broadleaf toadflax, Dalmatian toadflax
Linaria vulgaris†‡ – common toadflax, yellow toadflax, butter-and-eggs
Mohavea breviflora – golden desert-snapdragon, lesser mohavea
Penstemon cyanocaulis – bluestem penstemon, bluestem beardtongue
Penstemon franklinii – Franklin's penstemon
Penstemon gibbensii – Gibbens' beardtongue
Penstemon grahamii – Uinta Basin beardtongue, Graham's beardtongue
Penstemon navajoa – Navajo Mountain beardtongue, Navajo beardtongue
Penstemon palmeri – Palmer's penstemon
Penstemon pinorum – Pine Valley penstemon, pinyon penstemon
Penstemon scariosus – White River beardtongue, White River beardtongue, Neese's Blue Mountain beardtongue, Garrett's beardtongue

Poaceae
Achnatherum aridum – Mormon needlegrass
Achnatherum lettermanii – Letterman's needlegrass
Achnatherum nelsonii – Columbia needlegrass, subalpine needlegrass, western needlegrass
Achnatherum parishii (also Stipa parishii) – Parish's needlegrass
Achnatherum thurberianum – Thurber's needlegrass
Aegilops cylindrica†‡ – jointed goatgrass
Aristida purpurea – purple three-awn
Arundo donax†‡ – giant cane, elephant grass, carrizo, arundo, Spanish cane, Colorado river reed, wild cane, giant reed
Blepharidachne kingii – King's eyelashgrass
Bouteloua eriopoda – black grama
Bouteloua gracilis – blue grama
Bromus tectorum† – drooping brome, cheatgrass
Calamagrostis rubescens – pinegrass
Cynodon dactylon†‡ – Bermuda grass, Dhoob, dūrvā grass, ethana grass, dubo, dog's tooth grass, Bahama grass, devil's grass, couch grass, Indian doab, arugampul, grama, wiregrass, scutch grass, crab grass
Distichlis spicata – seashore saltgrass, inland saltgrass, desert saltgrass
Elymus elymoides – squirreltail
Elymus repens†‡ – couch grass, common couch, twitch, quick grass, quitch grass, quitch, dog grass, quackgrass, scutch grass, witchgrass
Hilaria rigida – big galleta
Imperata cylindrica†‡ – cogongrass, kunai grass, blady grass, satintail, spear grass, sword grass, thatch grass, alang-alang, lalang grass, cotton wool grass, kura-kura
Melica stricta – rock melic
Oryzopsis hymenoides (or Achnatherum hymenoides or Stipa hymenoides) – Indian ricegrass, sand rice grass
Phragmites australis†‡ – common reed
Pseudoroegneria spicata – bluebunch wheatgrass
Puccinellia simplex – California alkaligrass, western alkali grass
Sorghum almum†‡
Sorghum halepense†‡ – Johnson grass, Johnsongrass
Sporobolus wrightii – big sacaton, giant sacaton
Stipa lemmonii – Lemmon's needlegrass

Polemoniaceae
Aliciella caespitosa (or Gilia caespitosa) – Rabbit Valley gilia, Wonderland Alice-flower
Aliciella leptomeria – sand gilia, Great Basin gilia
Aliciella tenuis – Mussentuchit gilia, Mussentuchit Creek gilia
Gilia ophthalmoides – eyed gilia
Gilia transmontana – transmontane gilia
Leptosiphon harknessii – Harkness' flaxflower
Loeseliastrum depressum – depressed ipomopsis
Polemonium viscosum – sky pilot, skunkweed, sticky Jacobs-ladder, sticky polemonium

Polygonaceae
Eriogonum alatum – winged buckwheat, winged eriogonum
Eriogonum corymbosum var. smithii – Flat Tops wild buckwheat
Eriogonum corymbosum var. nilesii – Nile's wild buckwheat, Las Vegas buckwheat, golden buckwheat
Eriogonum heermannii – Heermann's buckwheat
Eriogonum jamesii – James' buckwheat, antelope sage
Eriogonum nidularium – birdnest buckwheat
Eriogonum nummulare – Kearney's buckwheat, money buckwheat
Eriogonum soredium – Frisco buckwheat
Eriogonum thomasii – Thomas' buckwheat
Eriogonum zionis – Zion wild buckwheat, Point Sublime wild buckwheat
Polygonum utahense – Utah knotweed
Pterostegia drymarioides – woodland threadstem, woodland pterostegia, fairy mist, fairy bowties
Reynoutria japonica (or Polygonum cuspidatum or Fallopia japonica)†‡ – Asian knotweed, Japanese knotweed

Primulaceae
Androsace filiformis – filiform rockjasmine, slender-stemmed androsace
Dodecatheon alpinum – alpine shooting star
Dodecatheon dentatum – white shooting star, toothed American cowslip
Dodecatheon redolens (also Primula fragrans) – scented shooting star
Primula cusickiana (or Primula maguirei) – Cusick's primrose, Maquire primrose

Pteridaceae
Argyrochosma jonesii – Jones' false cloak fern
Myriopteris covillei (formerly Cheilanthes covillei) – Coville's lip fern
Myriopteris parryi (formerly Cheilanthes parryi) – Parry's lip fern

Ranunculaceae
Aquilegia flavescens – yellow columbine
Aquilegia formosa – crimson columbine, western columbine, red columbine
Aquilegia grahamii – Graham's columbine
Delphinium parishii – desert larkspur
Ranunculus aestivalis – fall buttercup, autumn buttercup
Thalictrum occidentale – western meadow-rue

Rhamnaceae
Ceanothus fendleri – Fendler's ceanothus, Fendler's buckbrush, deer brier
Ceanothus velutinus – snowbrush ceanothus, red root, tobacco brush
Rhamnus alnifolia – alderleaf buckthorn, alder buckthorn

Rosaceae
Amelanchier utahensis – Utah serviceberry
Cercocarpus ledifolius var. intricatus – little-leaf mountain mahogany, narrowleaf mahogany, dwarf mountain mahogany
Coleogyne ramosissima – blackbrush
Crataegus chrysocarpa – fireberry hawthorn, goldenberry hawthorn
Crataegus saligna – willow hawthorn
Ivesia kingii (or Potentilla kingii) – King's mousetail
Peraphyllum ramosissimum – squaw apple, wild crab apple
Physocarpus malvaceus – mallow ninebark
Potentilla angelliae – Angell cinquefoil, Boulder Mountain cinquefoil
Potentilla cottamii – Cottam's cinquefoil, Pilot Range cinquefoil
Prunus virginiana – bitter-berry, chokecherry, Virginia bird cherry, western chokecherry, black chokecherry
Purshia glandulosa – antelope bitterbrush, desert bitterbrush, Mojave antelope brush
Purshia stansburyana (or Purshia stansburiana) – Stansbury's cliffrose
Purshia tridentata – bitterbrush, antelope bush, buckbrush, quinine brush, deerbrush, blackbrush, greasewood
Rosa woodsii – Woods' rose, interior rose

Rubiaceae
Galium bifolium – twinleaf bedstraw, low mountain bedstraw
Galium coloradoense – Colorado bedstraw
Galium desereticum
Galium emeryense – Emery County bedstraw
Galium hypotrichium – alpine bedstraw
Galium magnifolium – largeleaf bedstraw
Galium mexicanum – Mexican bedstraw
Galium multiflorum – Kellogg's bedstraw, shrubby bedstraw, many-flowered bedstraw
Galium munzii – Munz's bedstraw
Galium proliferum – limestone bedstraw
Galium stellatum – starry bedstraw, desert bedstraw
Houstonia rubra – red bluet

Salicaceae
Populus angustifolia – narrowleaf cottonwood
Populus tremuloides – quaking aspen, trembling aspen, American aspen, mountain aspen, golden aspen, trembling poplar, white poplar, popple
Salix amygdaloides – peachleaf willow
Salix arizonica – Arizona willow
Salix bebbiana –  beaked willow, long-beaked willow, gray willow, Bebb's willow, red willow
Salix boothii – Booth's willow
Salix brachycarpa – barren-ground willow, small-fruit willow, shortfruit willow
Salix cascadensis
Salix cinerea† – common sallow, gray sallow, gray willow, grey sallow, grey willow, grey-leaved sallow, large gray willow, pussy willow, rusty sallow
Salix drummondiana – Drummond's willow
Salix exigua – sandbar willow, narrowleaf willow, coyote willow
Salix fragilis† – crack willow, brittle willow
Salix geyeriana – Geyer's willow, Geyer willow, silver willow
Salix glauca – gray willow, grayleaf willow, white willow, glaucous willow
Salix gooddingii – Goodding's willow, Goodding's black willow
Salix laevigata – red willow, polished willow
Salix lasiolepis – arroyo willow
Salix ligulifolia – strapleaf willow
Salix lucida – shining willow, Pacific willow, whiplash willow
Salix lutea – yellow willow
Salix matsudana† – Chinese willow
Salix melanopsis – dusky willow
Salix monticola – mountain willow, cherry willow, serviceberry willow, park willow
Salix nivalis – net-leaved willow, snow willow
Salix petrophila – alpine willow, Rocky Mountain willow
Salix planifolia – planeleaf willow, diamondleaf willow, tea-leafed willow
Salix prolixa – MacKenzie's willow
Salix scouleriana – Scouler's willow
Salix wolfii

Santalaceae
Phoradendron californicum – desert mistletoe, mesquite mistletoe
Phoradendron juniperinum – juniper mistletoe

Sarcobataceae
Sarcobatus vermiculatus – greasewood, seepwood, saltbush

Saururaceae
Anemopsis californica – yerba mansa, lizard tail

Simmondsiaceae
Simmondsia chinensis – Jojoba, goat nut, deer nut, pignut, wild hazel, quinine nut, coffeeberry, gray box bush

Solanaceae
Hyoscyamus niger†‡ – henbane, black henbane, stinking nightshade
Lycium andersonii – water-jacket, redberry desert-thorn, Anderson thornbush, Anderson's desert thorn, Anderson boxthorn, Anderson lycium, Anderson wolfberry, squawberry
Lycium barbarum† – Chinese wolfberry, Chinese boxthorn, Himalayan goji, Tibetan goji, mede berry, barbary matrimony vine, red medlar, matrimony vine, Duke of Argyll's tea tree, Duke of Argyll's tea plant, Murali
Lycium cooperi – peach thorn
Lycium pallidum – pale wolfberry, pale desert-thorn
Lycium torreyi – Torrey wolfberry

Tamaricaceae
Tamarix ramosissima†‡ – saltcedar, salt cedar, tamarisk

Violaceae
Viola frank-smithii – Frank Smith's violet
Viola praemorsa – canary violet, Astoria violet, yellow montane violet

Vitaceae
Vitis arizonica – Arizona grape

Zygophyllaceae
Fagonia laevis – California fagonbush
Larrea tridentata – creosote bush, greasewood, chaparral, gobernadora, hediondilla
Tribulus terrestris†‡ – goat's-head, bindii, bullhead, burra gokharu, bhakhdi, caltrop, small caltrops, cat's-head, devil's eyelashes, devil's-thorn, devil's-weed, puncture vine, tackweed

Individual trees
These are named specific trees that are each special for different reasons.
Jardine Juniper – A Rocky Mountain juniper found within Logan Canyon in the Cache National Forest that is about 1,500 years old.
Pando – A clonal colony of an individual male quaking aspen determined to be a single living organism by identical genetic markers and assumed to have one massive underground root system. Pando occupies  and is estimated to weigh collectively , making it the heaviest known organism.
Thousand Mile Tree – A pine tree located in Weber Canyon near the community of Henefer, Utah along the Overland Route of the Union Pacific Railroad.

See also
Flora of the Colorado Plateau and Canyonlands region
Pinyon–juniper woodland
Rocky Mountain Floristic Region
Sagebrush steppe
Utah Native Plant Society
Wasatch and Uinta montane forests
Wyoming Basin shrub steppe

Notes

References

 
Flora
Utah